Villaute is a small village in the west of the province of Burgos, Spain. It is about 45 km from the province capital of Burgos, and 5 km from the town of Villadiego.

The main sites in the village are the 12th-century church of St. Martin (which is one of the few in the world containing two apses) and the 15th-century defensive tower (castle) which was declared a national monument on April 22, 1949.

References

Municipalities in the Province of Burgos